I Really Like You is a 2015 song by Carly Rae Jepsen, from the album Emotion

But I Really Like You also may refer to:

Music 
 "I Really Like You", a song by Jewelry from the album Beloved
 "I Really Like You", a song by the Lovely from the album Hind Hind Legs
 "I Really Like You" a song by Melissa Etheridge from the album Your Little Secret
 "Young Girl"/"I Really Like You" a song by Pharrell Williams from the album In My Mind
 "I Really Like You (Not Him)" a song by Pia Zadora from the album When the Lights Go Out

See also 
 "You Really Got Me" (different phrase to "I Really Like You"), a 1964 song by The Kinks, also covered by Van Halen in 1978